Martina Navratilova and Pam Shriver defeated Claudia Kohde and Eva Pfaff in the final, 6–4, 6–2 to win the 1982 Australian Open. It was the first of seven consecutive titles for the team.

Kathy Jordan and Anne Smith were the defending champions but only Smith competed that year with Billie Jean King. King and Smith lost in the semifinals to Navratilova and Shriver.

Seeds
Champion seeds are indicated in bold text while text in italics indicates the round in which those seeds were eliminated.

Draw

Final

Top half

Bottom half

External links
 Draw at WTA
 1982 Australian Open – Women's draws and results at the International Tennis Federation

Women's Doubles
Australian Open (tennis) by year – Women's doubles